The Miss Virginia World competition is a beauty pageant that selects the representative for Virginia in the Miss World America pageant.

The current Miss Virginia World is Catherine Perez of New York City, NY.

Winners 
Color key

Notes to table

References

External links

Virginia culture
Women in Virginia